McKinney is a census-designated place in Lincoln County in south-central Kentucky. McKinney has a post office with ZIP code 40448. Its population was estimated to be 135 between 2014 and 2018.

Demographics

Notable people
 William B. Baugh, awarded a Medal of Honor for his actions in the Korean War
 Harry Camnitz, professional baseball player.
 Joseph K. Carson, Jr., 40th mayor of Portland, Oregon

References

Unincorporated communities in Lincoln County, Kentucky
Census-designated places in Lincoln County, Kentucky
Unincorporated communities in Kentucky
Census-designated places in Kentucky